The 4th Utah Senate District is located in Salt Lake County and includes Utah House Districts 36, 37, 40, 44, 45, and 46. The current State Senator representing the 4th district is Jani Iwamoto. Iwamoto was elected to the Utah Senate in 2014 and is up for re-election in 2018.

Previous Utah State Senators (District 4)

Election results

2014 General Election

See also
 Jani Iwamoto
 Pat Jones
 Utah Democratic Party
 Utah Republican Party
 Utah Senate

References

External links
 Utah Senate District Profiles
 Official Utah State Senate Page for Jani Iwamoto

04
Salt Lake County, Utah